The 2018–19 Biathlon World Cup – Pursuit Men started on Sunday 9 December 2018 in Pokljuka and finished on Saturday 23 March 2019 in Oslo Holmenkollen. The defending titlist was Martin Fourcade of France.

The small crystal globe winner for the category was Johannes Thingnes Bø of Norway.

Competition format
The  pursuit race is skied over five laps. The biathlete shoots four times at any shooting lane, in the order of prone, prone, standing, standing, totalling 20 targets. For each missed target a biathlete has to run a  penalty loop. Competitors' starts are staggered, according to the result of the previous sprint race.

2017–18 Top 3 standings

Medal winners

Standings

References

Pursuit Men